Glyphidocera notolopha is a moth in the family Autostichidae. It was described by Edward Meyrick in 1929. It is found in Pará, Brazil.

The wingspan is about 8 mm. The forewings are whitish ochreous, with some scattered minute fuscous specks and a dark fuscous linear mark in the disc at one-fifth, the discal stigmata are fuscous and there is a slight mark of fuscous suffusion along the costa beyond the middle. The hindwings are whitish grey.

References

Moths described in 1929
Glyphidocerinae